Loudetia is a genus of African, Arabian, and South American plants in the grass family.

 Species

 formerly included
several species now considered better suited to other genera: Danthoniopsis Loudetiopsis Trichopteryx Tristachya

References

External links
 Grassbase - The World Online Grass Flora

Poaceae genera
Panicoideae